Drake is a village in the Canadian province of Saskatchewan within the Rural Municipality of Usborne No. 310 and Census Division No. 11.

History 
Drake incorporated as a village on September 19, 1910.

Demographics 

Economy

Drake is mostly a farming community, supported by the crops and livestock of the surrounding farms.  However, two successful large-scale businesses, Drake Meat Processors and Bergen Industries, were founded in and operate from the village, keeping it from becoming a loose connection of farms.

Education

The local school, Drake Elementary School, is used by elementary-aged students from Drake (as well as surrounding areas without their own school, such as Lockwood).  After Grade 8, students go to the nearby Lanigan Central High School to complete their secondary education.  Despite decreasing enrollment, DES finds strong support in the community; however, recent changes to the school division structuring across Saskatchewan have left its long-term future in doubt.

Sports
Drake is home to the 2018 Senior Hockey Saskatchewan Provincial C, Long Lake Hockey League champions, the Drake Canucks.

A separate Canucks senior men's team was a founding member in 1965 of the Highway Hockey League in central Saskatchewan.

Notable people

Home of former National Hockey League player Robin Bartel.

See also 

 List of communities in Saskatchewan
 Villages of Saskatchewan

References

External links

Villages in Saskatchewan
Usborne No. 310, Saskatchewan
Division No. 11, Saskatchewan